MŽRKL League for the season 2012–13 was the eleventh season of the Adriatic League. The study included eleven teams from four countries, a champion for the second time in team history became the Partizan Galenika.  In this season participating clubs from Serbia, Bosnia and Herzegovina, Slovenia and from Hungary.

MŽRKL League for the season 2012–13 has begun to play 26 September 2012 and ended on 23 February 2013, when he it was completed a Regular season. Final Four to be played from 2–3 March 2013. in Novi Sad, Serbia. Winner Final Four this season for the team Partizan Galenika from Serbia.

Cadet MŽRKL League this season playing for the first time. It was intended to be played this season, and in the case of success to continue next season. Cadet MŽRKL League comprises 11 teams, where each team plays each at once. One team is organizing a mini tournament where four teams play two rounds of the league for a weekend and so once a month. Top 4 teams qualify for the Final Four to be played in the same place for seniors and the same weekend play. Winner Final Four this season  for the first time in team history became the team Trešnjevka 2009 from Croatia.

Team information

Regular season
The League of the season was played with 11 teams and play a dual circuit system, each with each one game at home and away. The four best teams at the end of the regular season were placed in the Final Four. The regular season began on 26 September 2012 and it will end on 23 February 2013.

Final four
Final Four to be played from 2–3 March 2013. in the SPC Vojvodina in Novi Sad, Serbia.

Awards
Player of the Year: Milica Dabović (175-PG-82) of Partizan Galenika 
Guard of the Year: Milica Dabović (175-PG-82) of Partizan Galenika 
Forward of the Year: Sanja Orozović (183-G-90) of Athlete Celje 
Center of the Year: Amy Jaeschke (196-C-89) of Peac-Pécs 
Defensive Player of the Year: Milica Dabović (175-PG-82) of Partizan Galenika 
Coach of the Year: Marina Maljković of Partizan Galenika 

1st Team
PG: Tamara Radočaj (170-87) of Partizan Galenika 
PG: Milica Dabović (175-82) of Partizan Galenika 
G: Sanja Orozović (183-90) of Athlete Celje 
C: Amy Jaeschke (196-89) of Peac-Pécs 
PF: Dragana Stanković (193-95) of Sloboda Novi Grad 

2nd Team
PG: Jovana Popović (173-90) of Vojvodina NIS 
G: Nataša Bučevac (179-85) of Vojvodina NIS 
G: Andrea Barbour (177-89) of Peac-Pécs 
F/C: Tina Jovanović (190-91) of Radivoj Korać 
C: Jelena Velinović (193-81) of Mladi Krajišnik 

Honorable Mention
Jelena Antić (187-SF-91) of Partizan Galenika 
Snežana Čolić (178-G-92) of Radivoj Korać 
Nataša Ivančević (188-PF-81) of Vojvodina NIS 
Ivona Bogoje (193-C-76) of Partizan Galenika 
Marica Gajić (187-C-95) of Athlete Celje

References

External links
 2012–13 MŽRKL at eurobasket.com
 2012–13 MŽRKL at srbijasport.net

2012-13
2012–13 in European women's basketball leagues
2012–13 in Serbian basketball
2012–13 in Bosnia and Herzegovina basketball
2012–13 in Slovenian basketball
2012–13 in Hungarian basketball